Brock L. Forsey (born February 11, 1980) is a former American football running back of the National Football League.  He was originally drafted by the Chicago Bears in the sixth round of the 2003 NFL Draft. He played football at Centennial High School before playing college football at Boise State.

College career
With the Boise State Broncos, Forsey became only the third player ever to record more than 30 touchdowns (six receiving and 26 rushing) in one season, joining Troy Edwards and Barry Sanders.

Professional career

Chicago Bears
Forsey was drafted by the Chicago Bears in the sixth round (206th overall) in the 2003 NFL Draft.  He saw his first significant playing time as a rookie on October 26, 2003, rushing for 56 yards and a touchdown against the Detroit Lions. Forsey experienced his best game as a pro on November 30 against the Arizona Cardinals, filling in for starter Anthony Thomas, who had viral pneumonia.  Against Arizona, Forsey carried the ball 27 times for 134 yards (5.0 average) and a touchdown.  He also caught two passes for 27 yards as the Bears went on to win 28-3.

Forsey finished his rookie season with 11 games played (two starts), 191 rushing yards and two touchdowns.  He caught three passes for 37 yards, and did not fumble in 53 touches.

With the Bears during the 2004 preseason, Forsey had 27 carries for 97 yards and a touchdown.  He added three receptions for 16 yards.  Nevertheless, Forsey was released at the conclusion of the preseason, unable to earn a spot in a crowded backfield that included Thomas Jones, Anthony Thomas and Adrian Peterson.

Miami Dolphins
On September 22, 2004 Forsey worked out for the Miami Dolphins.  He signed with the team a week later after running back Lamar Gordon was placed on injured reserve.  Forsey first appeared with the Dolphins on October 10 against the New England Patriots, rushing 13 times for 44 yards.

Forsey was briefly waived by the Dolphins on December 4, but re-signed three days later when running back Leonard Henry was released.  He was inactive for the remaining games of the season.  He finished the year with 19 carries for 53 yards and a fumble in six games.

On April 29, 2005, Forsey was released by the Dolphins.

Washington Redskins
On May 5, 2005, Forsey signed a one-year, $380,000 deal with the Washington Redskins.  With Clinton Portis, Ladell Betts, Rock Cartwright and others ahead of him on the depth chart, Forsey was given just one carry in the preseason and gained no yards.

He was released by the team on August 29 - before the team's final preseason game.  It was the last time he was a member of an NFL team.

See also
 List of NCAA Division I FBS running backs with at least 50 career rushing touchdowns
 List of NCAA major college football yearly scoring leaders

References

American football return specialists
American football running backs
Boise State Broncos football players
Chicago Bears players
Miami Dolphins players
Washington Redskins players
Players of American football from Idaho
1980 births
Living people
People from Meridian, Idaho